Arnfinn a Norwegian masculine given name that may refer to
Arnfinn Bårdsen (born 1966), Norwegian judge
Arnfinn Bergmann (1928–2011), Norwegian ski jumper 
Jens Arnfinn Brødsjømoen (born 1958), Norwegian politician 
Arnfinn Engerbakk (born 1964), Norwegian football midfielder
Arnfinn Graue (1926–2021), Norwegian nuclear physicist 
Arnfinn Haga (born 1936), Norwegian teacher and non-fiction writer
Arnfinn Heje (1877–1958), Norwegian sailor
Arnfinn Hofstad (born 1934), Norwegian businessperson
Arnfinn Kristiansen (born 1971), Norwegian bobsledder
Arnfinn Laudal (born 1936), Norwegian mathematician
Arnfinn Lund (1935–2017), Norwegian horse trainer
Arnfinn Moland (born 1951), Norwegian historian
Arnfinn Nergård (born 1952), Norwegian politician 
Arnfinn Nesset (born 1936), Norwegian nurse and serial killer
Arnfinn Severin Roald (1914–1983), Norwegian politician 
Arnfinn Vik (1901–1990), Norwegian politician 

Norwegian masculine given names